Meri Zabaan is a 1989 Indian Hindi-language action thriller film directed by Shibu Mitra. The film features an ensemble cast of Mithun Chakraborty, Shashi Kapoor, Amjad Khan, Vinod Mehra, Farah Naaz, Kimi Katkar and Tanuja.

Plot

Meri Zubaan is an action thriller, featuring Mithun Chakraborty and Shashi Kapoor , well supported by Farha, Kimi Katkar, Tanuja, Vinod Mehra and Amjad Khan.

Cast

Soundtrack

References

External links

 http://www.bollywoodhungama.com/movies/cast/5321/index.html

1980s Hindi-language films
1989 films
Films scored by Anu Malik
Indian action films
Films directed by Shibu Mitra
1989 action films